Jānis Puriņš was a Latvian Rifleman and later colonel (since 1925), commander of the 1st Kurzeme Division of the Latvian Army and commander of the Eastern Front during the Latgale liberation operation during the Latvian War of Independence. He received the Knight's rank of the Order of Lāčplēsis.

Biography
Puriņš was born on April 25, 1889, in the "Sakaiņi" homestead in Mārsnēni Parish near Priekuļi to the family of farmer Jānis senior. As a child, Puriņš studied at the Rauna Parish school and Valmiera city school. In November 1910, he was drafted into the army of the Russian Empire. He served as head of the Cēsis war district, then in the curatorium of the Vilnius Military District. At the beginning of the First World War, in 1915 he was transferred to the 173rd, later the 3rd Reserve Regiment in Toropec and Peterhof. From October 1916 to February 1917 he studied at the 1st Moscow Praporshchik School. He was the leader of the 4th Vidzeme Latvian Riflemen Regiment, later - the commander of a machine gun team until demobilization in March 1918.

On March 31, Puriņš was appointed battalion commander after taking Riga, he was promoted to lieutenant colonel and head of the Riga Fortified District

In June 1919, Lieutenant Colonel Puriņš was sent to the Latgale Front in the vicinity of Lubāna and Atašiene and on August 7 he was appointed commander of the 2nd Ventspils Infantry Regiment . On October 16, he was appointed Commander of the 1st Kurzeme Division and Commander of the Eastern Front. He led the division's battles against the Bermontians in Selonia and held a front against the Red Army along the banks of the Daugava. During the operation to liberate Latgale, Latvian Army units under the command of Lieutenant Colonel Puriņš captured most of Latgale from the Red Army. On August 13, 1920, he was awarded the Military Order of Lāčplēsis for leading battles in Latgale and for winning battles at Daugavpils and the liberation of Rēzekne, and was appointed a member of the Council of the Order.

On September 29, 1920, Janis Puriņš resigned as the commander of the Kurzeme Division, but remained as the commander of the 2nd Ventspils Infantry Regiment. On June 22, 1925, he was promoted to colonel. In the middle of 1928, he was transferred to the Riga War District Administration. At the end of the 1930s, he again served as commander of the regiment, retired from service in 1939, and lived in his father's home in Sakaiņi, Mārsnēni Parish.

During the Second World War he was the commandant of the Mārsnēni, Liepa and Ranka parishes (1941-1944). On October 13, 1944, during the Soviet re-occupation of Latvia, he was arrested by Soviet soldiers and on November 18, 1944, after the verdict of the 3rd Baltic Navy Military Tribunal, Jānis Puriņš was imprisoned in Riga's 2nd Prison, where he disappeared and was likely executed.

References

Bibliography
Es viņu pazīstu: latviešu biogrāfiskā vārdnīca. [redaktors Žanis Unāms]. [Grandheivena]: Raven Printing, 1975.398.lpp.
Bebris, R. "Daugavpils atbrīvošana 1920. gada 3. janvārī." Militārs apskats, 1935. Nr. 2, 214.-229. lpp.

1889 births
1944 deaths
People from the Governorate of Livonia
Recipients of the Order of Lāčplēsis, 1st class
Russian military personnel of World War I
Latvian military personnel of the Latvian War of Independence
German military personnel of World War II
German prisoners of war in World War II held by the Soviet Union
Latvian collaborators with Nazi Germany